Bridge is the first solo album by Californian punk rock musician Joey Cape, frontman of Lagwagon and Bad Astronaut, released on September 29, 2008, through Suburban Home Records.

Unlike Cape's work in his bands, the album is an acoustic alternative/indie rock album, much like his work with Tony Sly on their collaborative album Acoustic from 2004. In the album's booklet, Cape describes the solo album as a "rite of passage."

5 songs on the album are acoustic renditions of songs previously released on the Lagwagon EP I Think My Older Brother Used to Listen to Lagwagon which was released in August of the same year. Those are: "Errands", "B Side", "Memoirs and Landmines", "No Little Pill" and "Mission Unaccomplished".

Track listing

Personnel 
 Joey Cape - lead vocals, acoustic guitar, production, engineering

External links 
 

Joey Cape albums
2008 albums
Suburban Home Records albums
Albums produced by Joey Cape